The Portrait of Beatrice Cenci is a painting attributed to the Italian Baroque painter Guido Reni. It is housed in the Galleria Nazionale d'Arte Antica of Palazzo Barberini, Rome. The painting dealt with a controversial topic of Beatrice Cenci, a woman who was executed by Papal authorities, specifically Pope Clement VIII Aldobrandini.

Description
The author of this work has been previously highly debated, with many previous critics assigning the work to Elisabetta Sirani, and categorizing as a statement by a 17th-century feminist. She is depicted in the white robes of a Roman Sybil or perhaps a vestal virgin, evoking sympathy. She looks back melancholic at an angle backward. Tradition holds that he painted the work for the Cardinal Ascanio Colonna. The work has inspired many romantic artists including Stendhal, Percy Shelley, Dumas, Artaud, and Guerrazzi. The debate over the authorship and its influence are as interesting as the work itself. Traditions with no factual documentation claim Reni entered her cell the day prior to the execution, or saw her on the way to the scaffold. Others claim he was not even in Rome at that date. The earliest Barberini catalogue states it likely depicts the Cenci girl by an unknown painter; only a later one attributes the work to Reni.

References

1600 paintings
Paintings by Guido Reni
Collections of the Galleria Nazionale d'Arte Antica
17th-century portraits
Portraits of women
Cultural depictions of Beatrice Cenci